FOX 9 may refer to one of the following television stations in the United States affiliated with the Fox Broadcasting Company:

KECY-TV, Yuma, Arizona / El Centro, California
KFNR, Rawlins, Wyoming
Satellite of KFNB in Casper, Wyoming
KMSP-TV, Minneapolis, Minnesota (O&O)
KNIN-TV, Caldwell/Boise, Idaho
WTOV-DT2, a digital channel of WTOV-TV in Steubenville, Ohio / Wheeling, West Virginia